Störmthal is a village, part of Großpösna in the Leipzig district in Saxony, Germany. It is known for its church in Baroque style. The organ, an early work by Zacharias Hildebrandt, was played and inaugurated by Johann Sebastian Bach and is still in mostly the condition of Bach's time.

History 

The area was settled from the 11th century when the village was founded. From 1350, the village was ruled by different noble families.

From 1675, Störmthal was ruled by Statz Friedrich von Fullen, who had an influential position at the Dresden court. He made the village an independent parish in 1690 and had the first village school opened a year later. The old church was demolished in 1722 and replaced by a new church, in Baroque style.

The new organ, completed in 1723, was built by Zacharias Hildebrandt. It was his first organ after he had studied in the workshop of Gottfried Silbermann. Approval of the completed instrument was carried out by Johann Sebastian Bach at the request of Von Fullen, the patron of the church. Bach was satisfied; he composed and directed a cantata for the dedication of church and organ on 2 November 1723, . The organ is one of few instruments played by Bach which is still mostly in the same condition. The organ has been praised for the "brilliantly proportioned plan of the façade", the functionality of its suspended action and wind system, and its "variety and quality of tone", namely an "endearing sweetness which diverges from the characteristically bold voice of Silbermann’s work".

Störmthal became part of Großpösna on 1 January 1996.

People 
 Johann Gottfried Hildebrandt (1724–1775), organ builder, son of Zacharias Hildebrandt, pupil of Gottfried Silbermann
 Friedrich Naumann (1860–1919), politician

Literature

References

External links 

 

Former municipalities in Saxony
Leipzig (district)
Populated places established in the 11th century